Markus Feulner (born 12 February 1982) is a German former professional footballer who mainly played as a midfielder.

Career

Early career
Born in Scheßlitz, Upper Franconia, Feulner went through the Bayern Munich academy, but was unable to gain a place in the first team. In January 2004, he signed for strugglers 1. FC Köln. Hampered by injuries, Feulner could only play 38 games for the first team in two and a half seasons as the club moved in and out of the topflight.

After a second relegation with Köln in 2006, Feulner signed for 1. FSV Mainz 05. Since then, even though Mainz was relegated the year after, he developed into an influential midfielder for the club and was rumored to have attracted interest from higher-profile teams such as Bayer Leverkusen.

On 18 March 2009, it was announced that Feulner had signed a three-year contract with Borussia Dortmund. He officially joined on 1 July 2009 on a free transfer where he met up with his former coach Jürgen Klopp.

1. FC Nürnberg
In summer 2011, Feulner moved to 1. FC Nürnberg where he played 28 matches and scored one goal in his first season.

FC Augsburg
After three years with FC Augsburg in the Bundesliga, Feulner ended his top level career and signed a new two-year contract with the club's reserve team, playing in fourth tier Regionalliga Bayern. Additionally he became assistant coach of the club's under-16-team.

Coaching career
At the end of the 2018–19 season, Feulner retired and was hired as a part of the technical staff of FC Augsburg's U15 squad.

Career statistics

Honors
Bayern Munich
 Bundesliga: 2002–03
 DFB-Pokal: 2002–03

Borussia Dortmund
 Bundesliga: 2010–11

References

External links
 
 

Living people
1982 births
Association football midfielders
German footballers
Germany under-21 international footballers
FC Bayern Munich footballers
FC Bayern Munich II players
1. FSV Mainz 05 players
1. FC Köln players
1. FC Köln II players
Borussia Dortmund players
Borussia Dortmund II players
1. FC Nürnberg players
FC Augsburg players
FC Augsburg II players
Bundesliga players
2. Bundesliga players
3. Liga players
Regionalliga players
People from Bamberg (district)
Sportspeople from Upper Franconia
Footballers from Bavaria